The University Match in a cricketing context is generally understood to refer to the annual fixture between Oxford University Cricket Club and Cambridge University Cricket Club.

From 2001, as part of the reorganisation of first-class cricket, the University Match was changed from a three-day first-class fixture, played at Lord's, to a one-day University Match at Lord's and a four-day first-class fixture played alternately at Fenner's and The Parks. In February, 2022 the MCC announced that from 2023 onwards the one-day fixture would no longer be held at Lord's. However in September, 2022, following opposition from a section of its membership, the club decided that the match would be held at Lord's in 2023 to allow time for further consultation. In March, 2023 it was announced that the fixture would continue to be played at Lord's until at least 2027, following which there would be a review and a possible vote in 2028 on whether the match should remain at Lord's.

Cambridge award a blue for either game, though Oxford award a blue for the four-day game only. At the same time, Oxford players have also played in the Oxford University Centre of Cricketing Excellence (Oxford UCCE, also including Oxford Brookes University, now superseded by the Oxford MCCU), and Cambridge players in the Cambridge University Centre of Cricketing Excellence (Cambridge UCCE, including Anglia Ruskin University and now the Cambridge MCCU). However, only those at Oxford and Cambridge Universities are eligible to play in the University Match(es).

The four-day match lost its first-class status after the 2020 fixture.

History

The match was first played in 1827, at Lord's, at the instigation of Charles Wordsworth who was also responsible for founding the Boat Race in 1829. The next two University matches were in 1829 and 1836. From 1838 it has been played annually, except for the war years of 1915–1918 and 1940–45. (From 1941 to 1945, a one-day fixture was played at Lord's, but these matches are not counted in the official records.) Lord's was to become its permanent venue from 1851 to 2000, but five of the early matches were played in the vicinity of Oxford.

It was traditionally an annual three-day first-class fixture. From the 1830s until 1939, it was among the most important fixtures of the season, attracting large crowds and widespread press coverage.  It was still a major social, as well as sporting, event as recently as just after World War II . According to The Cricketer (1954), the 1954 match attracted over 13,000 paying spectators as well as MCC members.

In terms of the clubs concerned, the University Match was the oldest first-class fixture still being played in 2020, its final year with first-class status. Matches between county teams prior to formation of the current county clubs have a longer history, with the oldest known county fixture between Kent and Surrey, which dates back to 1709 at least.

Despite never matriculating, Tom Wills was allowed to play for Cambridge in the 1856 match. He went on to found Australian rules football and coach the first Australian cricket team to tour England.

Some of the most dramatic matches in the long history of the fixture occurred in the 1870s. The first of these was 'Cobden's Match' in 1870. F. C. Cobden took the last three Oxford wickets in consecutive balls to give Cambridge victory by 2 runs. The following year S. E. Butler took 10–38 in the Cambridge first innings (the only instance of a bowler taking all ten), followed by five more wickets in the second innings. In 1873 Oxford won by only three wickets. The 1875 match was almost as close an affair as that in 1870. Needing 175 to win, Cambridge were 161–7 at one point, but were all out for 168 to lose by six runs.

Another notable match was in 1923, which became known as the "Thunderstorm match". Oxford had run up a good score, and a torrential storm for much of the night rendered the pitch almost unplayable, so that Cambridge were quickly dismissed in two innings.

William Yardley of Cambridge has the distinction of scoring the first two hundreds made in the series: 100 in 1870 in Cobden's Match and 130 in 1872.

Robin Marlar's bowling figures for Cambridge are worth noting:
 1951: 5–41 and 1–64
 1952: 7–104 and 2–25
 1953: 5–94 and 7–49

Players who became (or in a few instances were already) famous to have appeared in the match include: Alfred Lyttelton (Cantab. 1876–9), Allan Steel (Cantab. 1878–81), Stanley Jackson (Cantab. 1890–3), C. B. Fry (Ox. 1892–5), K. S. Ranjitsinhji (Cantab. 1893), Pelham Warner (Ox. 1895–6), Gilbert Jessop (Cantab. 1896–9), R. E. Foster (Ox. 1897–1900), Bernard Bosanquet (Ox. 1898–1900), Percy Chapman (Cantab. 1920–2), Douglas Jardine (Ox. 1920–1, 1923), Gubby Allen (Cantab. 1922–3), K. S. Duleepsinhji (Cantab. 1925–8), Nawab of Pataudi snr (Ox. 1929–31), Ken Farnes (Cantab. 1931–3), Martin Donnelly (Ox. 1946–7), Abdul Kardar (Ox. 1947–9), Peter May (Cantab. 1950–2), David Sheppard (Cantab. 1950–2), Colin Cowdrey (Ox. 1952–4), M. J. K. Smith (Ox. 1954–6), Ted Dexter (Cantab. 1956–8), Nawab of Pataudi jnr (Ox. 1960–1, 1963), Tony Lewis Cantab 1960–62), Mike Brearley (Cantab. 1961–4), Majid Khan (Cantab. 1971–3), Imran Khan (Ox. 1973–5) and Mike Atherton (Cantab. 1987, 1989). It can be seen that the majority were batsmen rather than bowlers and that the 1890s and 1950s to early 1960s were particularly fertile periods. At the time of writing, the most recent Oxbridge international cricketers are Ed Smith (Cantab. 1996–7) in Tests, and James Dalrymple (Ox. 2001–3) in limited-overs internationals.

From 2001 the match has been replaced by two fixtures each year: a one-day match played at Lord's and a four-day fixture (first-class up to and including 2020) played in alternate years at Fenner's in Cambridge and The Parks in Oxford. Blues are awarded to those appearing in either match for Cambridge players but only to Oxford players who appear in the four-day game. Unless otherwise stated, statistics quoted in this article are for the first-class fixtures only.

In 2008, for the first time a Twenty20 fixture was also played.

The 2020 four-day match was delayed until September because of the COVID-19 pandemic.

Records

Results 
Up to and including 2020, 176 first-class matches were scheduled. Cambridge won 61, Oxford won 58, 56 were drawn and one match (in 1988) was abandoned without a ball being bowled. The 2021 and 2022 – no longer first-class – matches were both drawn.

Highest and lowest scores by each side 
604 Cambridge University v Oxford University, The Parks, 2002
611-5d Oxford University v Cambridge University, The Parks, 2010
 39 Cambridge University v Oxford University, Lord's, 1858
 32 Oxford University v Cambridge University, Lord's, 1878

Individual triple centuries 
313* Sam Agarwal, Oxford, Fenner's, 2013 (also the highest first-class innings for Oxford University)

Individual double centuries 
247 Salil Oberoi, Oxford, Fenner's, 2005
238* Nawab of Pataudi senior, Oxford, Lord's, 1931
236* Jamie Dalrymple, Oxford, Fenner's, 2003
211 G Goonesena, Cambridge, Lord's, 1957
202 Matthew Naylor, Oxford, The Parks, 2018
201* M. J. K. Smith, Oxford, Lord's, 1954
201 Alan Ratcliffe, Cambridge, Lord's, 1931
200 Majid Khan, Cambridge, Lord's, 1970

Century on first-class debut 
185* AS Sharma, Oxford, The Parks, 2010
172 N Kruger, Oxford, The Parks, 2008
146 GT Hargrave, Oxford, Fenner's, 2019
125 DA Escott, Oxford, The Parks, 2016
116 MST Hughes, Oxford, Fenner's, 2015
112 Anand Ashok, Cambridge, Fenner's, 2009

Best innings bowling 
10–38 SE Butler, Oxford, Lord's, 1871
 9-? GB Lee, Oxford, Lord's, 1839
 8–44 GE Jeffery, Cambridge, Lord's, 1873
 8–52 GJ Toogood, Oxford, Lord's, 1985
 8–62 AG Steel, Cambridge, Lord's, 1878
 8–66 RHB Bettington, Oxford, Lord's, 1923
 8–68 EM Kenney, Oxford, Lord's, 1868
 8–99 PR Le Couteur, Oxford, Lord's, 1911
 8–161 JC Hartley, Oxford, Lord's, 1896
 8-? GE Yonge, Oxford, Lord's, 1845

Best match bowling 
 15–95 SE Butler, Oxford, Lord's, 1871
 14–119 EM Kenney, Oxford, Lord's, 1868
 13–73 AG Steel, Cambridge, Lord's, 1878

Hat-tricks 
 FC Cobden, Cambridge, Lord's, 1870
 AG Steel, Cambridge, Lord's, 1879
 PH Morton, Cambridge, Lord's, 1880
 JF Ireland, Cambridge, Lord's, 1911
 RGH Lowe, Cambridge, Lord's, 1926

Match double (100 runs & 10 wickets) 
 PR Le Couteur, Oxford, Lord's, 1910: 160 and 11–66
 GJ Toogood, Oxford, Lord's, 1985: 149 and 10–93

See also
Eton v Harrow
Gentlemen v Players
Varsity match
Oxbridge rivalry

Notes

References 
Barclays World of Cricket (2nd edition), 1980. 
Playfair Cricket Annual, 2006

External links 
OUCC 
CUCC

English domestic cricket competitions
English cricket in the 19th century
English cricket in the 20th century
English cricket in the 21st century
1827 establishments in England
First-class cricket matches
Cricket
Student cricket in the United Kingdom
Recurring sporting events established in 1827